The 2006 ECW One Night Stand was the second annual One Night Stand professional wrestling pay-per-view (PPV) event produced by World Wrestling Entertainment (WWE). It was held on June 11, 2006, at the Hammerstein Ballroom in the Manhattan borough of New York, New York. Like the previous year's event, although wrestlers from WWE's Raw and SmackDown! brand divisions had appeared on the show, it was primarily held as a reunion show for wrestlers from the former Extreme Championship Wrestling (ECW) promotion, the assets of which WWE acquired in 2003. Just prior to the event, WWE also established a third brand dubbed ECW for wrestlers of the former promotion and newer talent. The event was in turn WWE's first PPV to feature the ECW brand.

The main event was John Cena versus Rob Van Dam for the WWE Championship, which Van Dam won by pinfall after performing a Five Star Frog Splash following interference from Edge. The predominant match on the undercard was Rey Mysterio versus Sabu for the World Heavyweight Championship, which ended in a no contest after Sabu executed a Triple Jump DDT on Mysterio through a table on to the floor rendering both men kayfabe unable to wrestle, as a result, Mysterio retained the title. Another match on the undercard was Edge, Mick Foley, and Lita versus Terry Funk, Tommy Dreamer, and Beulah McGillicutty in a Hardcore Intergender match.

Production

Background
After the success of 2005's ECW One Night Stand pay-per-view (PPV), World Wrestling Entertainment (WWE) decided to hold another Extreme Championship Wrestling reunion show for June 11, 2006, establishing the hardcore-based PPV as an annual show for the promotion. Just like the previous year, the 2006 event was held at the Hammerstein Ballroom in the Manhattan borough of New York, New York. The build-up for the 2006 ECW One Night Stand occurred on both Raw and SmackDown! heading into the pay-per-view, but build-up behind the scenes began several months earlier, as WWE was bringing back ECW full-time. The news that WWE was planning to bring back ECW was leaked in the middle of April as Vince McMahon decided to revive the promotion as a third brand alongside Raw and SmackDown!, dubbed ECW. Reports beforehand stated that WWE was prepared to bring back ECW immediately after WrestleMania 22. WWE opted to cancel its webcast Velocity and replace it with the new ECW program. The new brand was officially confirmed by WWE on May 25, 2006, with its debut show airing on June 13 on the Sci Fi Channel. The 2006 ECW One Night Stand was in turn WWE's first PPV to feature the ECW brand.

Storylines

The main feud heading into One Night Stand was between John Cena and Rob Van Dam over the WWE Championship. At WrestleMania, Van Dam competed in a six-man Money in the Bank ladder match, in which Van Dam won and earned the right to face the champion of his choice anytime he wanted to in 12 months. On the May 22 episode of Raw, Van Dam announced that he would be cashing in his opportunity against Cena for the WWE Championship at One Night Stand. The two exchanged lefts and rights with Chris Masters (who Cena had just defeated in a match) also getting involved. The distraction allowed Van Dam to toss his briefcase into Cena's face and then hit him with the Van Daminator. The two had a contract signing for their match on the June 5, 2006 episode of Raw. Before signing the contract, Van Dam told Cena that he would win the WWE Championship at One Night Stand and rename it the ECW World Heavyweight Championship. ECW representative Paul Heyman told Cena that the ECW fans can't wait to boo him out of the Hammerstein Ballroom. Cena signed the contract and wished Van Dam luck. Heyman, however, told Cena that he had brought some people from ECW and at that point, Balls Mahoney, Terry Funk, Tommy Dreamer and the Sandman came to the ring. Cena attempted to fight them off, but Sandman hit Cena with his Singapore cane. ECW's Sabu then came out and sent Cena through the table with his Atomic Arabian Facebuster move. Several Raw superstars ran out to attempt to fight off the ECW Originals. Because of this, a match was booked for the WWE vs. ECW Head-to-Head special that aired on the USA Network on June 7, 2006 between Cena and Sabu. The match ended in a no contest after ECW's newest wrestler, The Big Show attacked Cena, sparking a brawl between WWE and ECW wrestlers.

The other main match on the card was a Hardcore Intergender match, as Edge and Mick Foley faced Terry Funk and Tommy Dreamer. The rivalry started between Edge and Foley, when the two faced in a Hardcore match at WrestleMania 22. Edge won the match after a spear off the apron and through a flaming table on the outside. Foley was a guest on the Cutting Edge on the May 1, 2006 episode of Raw, and the two agreed to a WrestleMania Hardcore rematch the following week. Before the match began on the May 8, 2006 edition of Raw, Foley announced that the match was now a triple threat match, with Tommy Dreamer added as the third person. During the match, however, Foley turned heel for the first time in over eight years and attacked Dreamer with a barbed wire baseball bat. Foley handed Edge the bat and Edge hit Dreamer with it, busting him open. Foley hit the Mandible claw on Dreamer and Edge simultaneously speared Dreamer, with Foley getting the pinfall. The two, along with Lita celebrated up the entrance ramp. On the May 15, 2006 episode of Raw, Foley wanted to apologize to Dreamer for what happened the previous week; however, Dreamer was not in the arena, so Foley brought out Terry Funk. Funk asked Foley to apologize for what happened to Dreamer. Instead, Foley started bashing ECW. In an attempt to get into a fight with Foley, Funk made comments about Foley's family, calling his wife a whore and his kids bastards. When the two exchanged punches, Edge and Lita came out, with Lita low-blowing Funk. Edge and Foley double-teamed Funk, with Edge hitting Funk with a barbed wire baseball bat. A week later, on the May 22, 2006 edition of Raw, Edge and Foley announced themselves as co-holders of the WWE Hardcore Championship. Paul Heyman came out and made a challenge to Edge and Foley to face Funk and Dreamer at One Night Stand, which Edge accepted. The two, along with Lita, went after Heyman up the ramp, before Dreamer and Funk attacked them with several weapons, sending the trio out of the arena. On the WWE vs. ECW Head to Head special that aired on June 7, 2006, Edge faced Dreamer in an Extreme Rules match. Dreamer hit Edge with a Dreamer Driver through the table. Lita interfered, and hit Dreamer repeatedly with a cane. Dreamer was not hurt by the shots, and he got Lita up for a powerbomb, before Edge speared Dreamer. Edge got the pinfall and won the match. During the match, Foley and Funk were fighting outside the ring, with Funk busting Foley open. After the match, Foley sat in the middle of the ring and stated his kayfabe thoughts on ECW.

One of the main undercard matches on the card was between Rey Mysterio and Sabu for the World Heavyweight Championship. ECW representative Paul Heyman announced that Mysterio had accepted the challenge for One Night Stand on the June 2, 2006 edition of SmackDown!. Before the June 9, 2006 edition of SmackDown!, Heyman kayfabe revealed to WWE's official website that he was trying to get Mysterio to join the new ECW brand. Mysterio turned down Heyman's offer on the June 9, 2006 edition of SmackDown!. In the main event on that edition of SmackDown!, Mysterio faced Finlay. Mysterio was about to 619 Finlay, when Sabu, who was holding a steel chair, climbed onto the ring apron. Mysterio dropkicked the chair into Sabu, which distracted the referee. This allowed Finlay to hit Mysterio with his shillelagh, and the Celtic Cross for the victory. After the contest, Sabu set up a table on the outside of the ring, and hit Mysterio with a springboard legdrop that sent Mysterio through the table.

Event

Paul Heyman began the event as it aired on pay-per-view, coming to the ring to "ECW" chants. Heyman stated that "this [ECW's resurrection] didn't happen because of me and it didn't happen because of Vince McMahon. This happened because of you [the fans]. And on behalf of every single one of us, from the bottom of my heart, thank you, thank you, thank you!"

The first match on the card was a match between ECW Original Tazz and WWE Raw commentator Jerry Lawler. In what was a squash match, Lawler slapped ECW commentator Joey Styles in the face en route to the ring. Tazz won after 35 seconds by making Lawler pass out to the Tazzmission. After the match, Tazz joined Joey Styles on commentary for the rest of the show.

In the second match ECW's Kurt Angle faced Raw's Randy Orton. Despite Angle's participation as an anti-ECW crusader from last year's One Night Stand he was met with raucous cheers from the ECW faithful. Randy Orton, by contrast, received an overwhelmingly negative reaction from the fans in attendance, and was subjected throughout the match to several derogatory chants   including "Go fuck Cena" and "Orton's a homo". Orton gained the main advantage in the match after Angle missed a Running Shoulder Tackle, which sent him into the ringpost. The crowd inside the Hammerstein Ballroom chanted "Boring!" as Orton applied a rear choke on Angle. Angle executed a series of German suplexes, before executing an Angle Slam for a near-fall. Orton attempted an RKO, but Angle countered, locking on the Ankle lock. Orton submitted, giving Angle the victory.

The Full Blooded Italians (Little Guido Maritato and Tony Mamaluke) versus Super Crazy and Tajiri was next. After Guido propelled Crazy into the crowd, Guido and Mamaluke executed the Muscle Buster on Tajiri for the victory. After the contest, Big Show entered the ring and executed the cobra clutch backbreaker on Mamaluke and kicked F.B.I.'s enforcer Big Guido in the head.

John "Bradshaw" Layfield made a surprise appearance, cutting a promo. Just over a week earlier, he announced on his radio show that he was not going to return to professional wrestling. JBL recalled his (legitimate) assault on The Blue Meanie from One Night Stand 2005 and referred to himself as "The King of Hardcore". He announced that he was replacing Tazz as the color commentator of SmackDown!.

Rey Mysterio versus Sabu was next in an Extreme Rules match with the World Heavyweight Championship on the line. The match started with several chair shots from both competitors. Sabu had the upper hand for most of the match, executing an Arabian Facebuster and a Triple Jump Moonsault, but Mysterio kicked out of both moves. Mysterio regained the upper hand, as he executed a Seated Senton that sent both men through a table at ringside. Sabu countered a second Seated Senton attempt, and put Mysterio on a second table at ringside. Sabu proceeded to execute a Triple-Jump Somersault Splash, but Mysterio made it to his feet while on the table. This turned the move into a DDT, sending both men through the table at ringside. Although neither men were legitimately hurt, Dr. Ferdinand Rios came out and kayfabe declared that the match could not continue. This meant that Mysterio retained the World Heavyweight Championship.

Edge and Mick Foley versus Tommy Dreamer and Terry Funk was next in what was a violent and bloody Hardcore Tag Team match. Before the match began, Edge and Foley entered the ring accompanied by Lita, while Dreamer and Funk entered the ring accompanied by Beulah McGillicutty, turning the match into a Hardcore six-person tag-team match. Lita's appearance at the event was received very negatively, with the crowd chanting "You're a crack whore" and "She's got herpes" at her. During the course of the match, Funk was taken backstage halfway through the match as Foley wrapped barbed wire around his fist and raked it across the forehead and eyes of Funk. A bandaged Funk returned to the match a few minutes later, hitting Edge and Foley with a Barbed Wire Bat. Funk then set the bat on fire and left it at ringside. Funk hit Foley, and Foley fell onto a Barbed Wire Board. Foley's shirt was on fire, but was put out by a ringside attendant. Dreamer and Funk got the upper-hand after Dreamer DDT'd Edge. Dreamer then locked a Modified Crossface onto Edge, using Barbed wire against Edge's face. Lita broke the hold up only to have Dreamer give her the Dreamer Driver. Edge blindsided Dreamer wrapping Barbed Wire around his head, before dropping him with the Inverted DDT. McGillicutty entered the ring to check on Dreamer, but Edge Speared McGillicutty and pinned her with a cover that resembled the "legs up" version of the missionary position.

Balls Mahoney faced Masato Tanaka in the second Extreme Rules match of the night. Mahoney got the early advantage after throwing a beer can in the face of Tanaka. Tanaka gained the advantage after executing a superplex off the top rope. Mahoney won the match after hitting Tanaka with a steel chair. Before the WWE Championship match, Eugene came to the ring to cut a promo. He reminded the fans that he was Eric Bischoff's nephew, before being interrupted by The Sandman. Sandman hit Eugene repeatedly with his Singapore cane, leaving Eugene to run to the back, with The Sandman chasing after him.

In the main event John Cena faced Rob Van Dam for the WWE Championship. It was evident that the crowd was decidedly anti-Cena even before the match began; in keeping with his traditional entrance, Cena threw the T-shirt he wore to the ring out into the crowd, only to have it thrown back at him a number of times. Loud, insulting chants were directed at Cena throughout the match, such as "Fuck you, Cena", "Same old shit", "Overrated" and "You can't wrestle". The action quickly went to ringside, and Van Dam got the advantage on Cena, with a Moonsault Press off the steel steps. Van Dam continued his offense when the action went back inside the ring as he placed a chair on Cena's stomach before executing the Rolling Thunder. Cena later managed to get the advantage, executing a DDT on a steel chair. Cena went for his finishing move, the FU, but Van Dam blocked the attempt. Van Dam would then set up a table in the corner, but Cena got Van Dam in the STFU. When John Cena refused to break the hold after Van Dam got to the ropes, Cena clotheslined the referee, after they had a push and shove. Cena proceeded to deliver Van Dam with a Superplex off the top rope and then hitting Van Dam with steel steps. Replacement referee Nick Patrick officiated the remainder of the match, with Van Dam kicking out of two. As Cena got up he went to deliver Van Dam an FU, Van Dam grabbed onto the rope, which leads Cena to deliver Van Dam an FU out of the ring. As Cena turned around, someone in a motorcycle helmet interfered and speared Cena through a table. The person was revealed as Edge, who won a number one contender's match to challenge for the WWE Championship at Vengeance on June 25, 2006. Edge also knocked out Nick Patrick. The Hammerstein Ballroom crowd chanted "Thank you Edge". Van Dam then executed the Five-Star Frog Splash on Cena, but there was no referee as Patrick was knocked out. Paul Heyman ran to the ring, and counted the pinfall to three, giving Van Dam the victory. The ECW locker room came to the ring to celebrate with Van Dam, but it was unclear at the time whether Van Dam was "officially" WWE Champion.

Reception
The overall reaction to the pay-per-view was very good, with 280,000 people ordering the event, down from the 325,000 orders the previous year.

Aftermath
On Raw the next day Paul Heyman addressed the controversy of Rob Van Dam's WWE Championship win. He announced that Vince McMahon ruled Van Dam's WWE Championship win as official and that the WWE Championship would be rechristened as the ECW World Heavyweight Championship on the premiere of ECW on Sci Fi. On the debut episode of ECW on June 13, 2006, Heyman presented Van Dam with the ECW World Heavyweight Championship. Van Dam said that he had opted to keep the spinner belt (sarcastically remarking that "this one spins!"), making him both WWE Champion and ECW World Heavyweight Champion. Edge, who was the number one contender for Van Dam's WWE Championship at Vengeance appeared, and speared Van Dam. Soon after, John Cena came through the crowd and attacked Edge, followed by a punch to Heyman, before being chased out by ECW Originals. At Vengeance, Van Dam defeated Edge to retain the WWE Championship while Cena defeated Sabu in an Extreme Rules lumberjack match.

The 2006 One Night Stand would be the last to include the "ECW" initialism in its title, as in 2007, the event was promoted as WWE One Night Stand, and was held as an event for wrestlers from all three of WWE's brands.

Results

See also
List of ECW supercards and pay-per-view events

References

External links
Official One Night Stand 2006 website

Extreme Championship Wrestling reunions and revivals
Extreme Championship Wrestling supercards and pay-per-view events
ECW (WWE brand)
Events in New York City
2006
2006 in New York City
Professional wrestling in New York City
2006 WWE pay-per-view events
June 2006 events in the United States